Fraternidad may refer to:

Fraternidad, Ocotepeque - a municipality in the Honduran department of Ocotepeque.
Fraternidad Tigres - a football club from La Paz 
Copa Fraternidad - name from 1971 to 1983 of a defunct annual  football competition held in Central America
Fraternity - Fraternidad is Fraternity in Spanish

See also
List of fraternities and sororities in Puerto Rico
List of Latino Greek Lettered Organizations